The 1991 Malaysian motorcycle Grand Prix was the last round of the 1991 Grand Prix motorcycle racing season. It took place on the weekend of 27–29 September 1991 at the Shah Alam circuit.

500 cc race report
Wayne Rainey and Kevin Schwantz out with broken bones in pre-race practice: Schwantz with a broken hand, Rainey with a broken femur at the knee joint. Months of rehabilitation were required for Rainey to get range of motion back into the leg.

John Kocinski on pole. Mick Doohan takes the start from Wayne Gardner and Kocinski.

Kocinski takes the lead from Gardner, with Doohan in 3rd looking like his set-up is wrong, his bike vibrating visibly.

Kocinski opens a large gap and wins. On the podium, Gardner and Doohan look at each other and simultaneously spray champagne on Kocinski, who runs off the stage in a panic. Kocinski is notorious for being obsessed with cleanliness.

The 1991 Malaysian motorcycle Grand Prix was the final race for Didier de Radigues and 2-times 250cc World Champion Sito Pons.

500 cc classification

References

Malaysian motorcycle Grand Prix
Malaysian
Motorcycle